The 2021–22 season is the 108th season in the existence of NK Lokomotiva Zagreb and the club's 13th consecutive season in the top flight of Croatian football. In addition to the domestic league, NK Lokomotiva Zagreb participated in this season's edition of the Croatian Cup.

Players

First-team squad

Other players under contract

Out on loan

Transfers

Pre-season and friendlies

Competitions

Overall record

Prva HNL

League table

Results summary

Results by round

Matches
The league fixtures were announced on 8 June 2021.

Croatian Cup

References

NK Lokomotiva Zagreb seasons
Lokomotiva